Larry Watkins (born May 22, 1948) is a retired Canadian football player who played for the Toronto Argonauts, Hamilton Tiger-Cats, Edmonton Eskimos and BC Lions. He played college football at Western Kentucky University University.

References

1948 births
Living people
Edmonton Elks players
Western Kentucky Hilltoppers football players
Toronto Argonauts players
Hamilton Tiger-Cats players